Shisizhang station is a station on the New Taipei Metro's Circular line. The station was opened on 31 January 2020. It is located in Xindian District, New Taipei, Taiwan, near the banks of the Xindian River. A depot for the Circular line is located directly adjacent the station.

The opening ceremony of the Circular line was held at this station, which was visited by President Tsai Ing-wen, Taipei Mayor Ko Wen-je, New Taipei Mayor Hou Yu-Ih, and the Minister of Transportation and Communications Lin Chia-lung.

The station provides a transfer to the Ankeng light rail which opened on February 10, 2023.

Station layout

Exits
Single Exit: Minquan Rd.

Around the station
 Shisizhang Temple
 National Human Rights Museum

References

2020 establishments in Taiwan
Circular line stations (Taipei Metro)
Railway stations opened in 2020
Ankeng light rail stations